Luca Lurati (born 22 August 1966) is a retired Swiss football midfielder.

References

1966 births
Living people
Swiss men's footballers
FC Chiasso players
FC Zürich players
Association football midfielders
Swiss Super League players